Fernando Patricio Martel Helo (born 2 October 1975) is a Chilean former footballer who played as a midfielder.

International career
Martel represented Chile at under-20 level in the 1995 FIFA World Youth Championship.

At senior level, he made 14 appearances for the Chile national team 2001 to 2004. In addition, he made an appearance for Chile B in the friendly match against Catalonia on 28 December 2001.

Honours

Club
Cobreloa
 Primera División de Chile (1): 2003 Apertura

Alianza Lima
 Peruvian Primera División (1): 2006 Descentralizado

Atlético Nacional
 Primera División de Colombia (1): 2007 Finalización

Deportes Iquique
 Primera B (1): 2010
 Copa Chile (1): 2010

References

External links
 
 Martel at Football Lineups

1975 births
Living people
Chilean people of French descent
People from San Felipe, Chile
Chilean footballers
Chilean expatriate footballers
Chile international footballers
Chile under-20 international footballers
Chilean Primera División players
Primera B de Chile players
Liga MX players
Peruvian Primera División players
Categoría Primera A players
Unión San Felipe footballers
Everton de Viña del Mar footballers
Santiago Morning footballers
Santiago Wanderers footballers
Cobreloa footballers
Chiapas F.C. footballers
Atlante F.C. footballers
Club Alianza Lima footballers
Atlético Nacional footballers
Ñublense footballers
Deportes Iquique footballers
C.D. Antofagasta footballers
Chilean expatriate sportspeople in Mexico
Chilean expatriate sportspeople in Peru
Chilean expatriate sportspeople in Colombia
Expatriate footballers in Mexico
Expatriate footballers in Peru
Expatriate footballers in Colombia
Association football midfielders